St Sampson's Church is the Church of England parish church of the village of Golant, Cornwall, England, United Kingdom; it is dedicated to St Sampson of Dol.

St Sampson's features in Simon Jenkins's book England's Thousand Best Churches, in which it is described as "warm and welcoming". The poet John Betjeman remarked that its pews were "extremely uncomfortable, recall the fidgets of Gus and Flora in Ravenshoe". It is open every day of the year, holds services every Sunday and evening prayer every Thursday evening at 6 o’clock. Its choir sings every 2nd and 4th Sunday of the month.

History

Saint Samson of Dol
Although Cornwall has more saints than any other county in the UK, Saint Sampson is one of the better known ones. He sometimes stayed in Golant while travelling to Brittany and became the archbishop of Dol.
Many Cornish saints travelling from Ireland to France via the south Cornish coast stopped on the way (sometimes in or near the village). There is now a footpath, the Saints' Way, popular with walkers which runs from Padstow on the north coast to Fowey passing through the village and past the church.

Later history
Until 1281 this church was a chapelry of Tywardreath and the people of Golant were required to contribute to the upkeep of Tywardreath church. In the period c. 1460 to 1508 the chapel at Golant was rebuilt and in 1508 they refused to make these contributions. The church and its churchyard were consecrated by a suffragan bishop (acting for Hugh Oldham, the Bishop of Exeter). Before that date burials had to be made at Tywardreath. The nave roof has inscriptions recording that its rebuilding was the work of various craft guilds while the south aisle roof was given by the Colquite family. There is a holy well near the porch enclosed in a 15th-century wellhouse.

Features of interest
St Sampson is portrayed in some of the stained glass windows in the church. The church has a ring of five bells. The organ was installed in 1995 and is a hybrid using some of the pipes from an organ originally in St Michael's Church, Newquay, and also some from the organ in Paul Parish Church. A specification of the organ can be found on the National Pipe Organ Register

List of the Vicars of Golant
The Vicars of Golant:

1528 Richard Baker
1554 William Boyne
1556 Thomas Boyne
1559 Roger Prior
1571 Nicholas Maine
1577 Benedict Tyack
1580 James Penhalurick
1615 Daniel Wetherell
???? Thomas Hore
1640 George Brush
1677 Thomas Sampson
1735 Robert Blatchford
1769 Peter Coryton
1770 R. Eastcott
1780 Wymond Cory
1820 Thomas Pearce
1841 Charles Lyne
1865 George Ross
1888 H. A. Hill
1892 A. H. Langridge
1894 B. F. Trusted
1900 W. H. Sharpe
1902 H. Lines
1919 E. A. L. Clarke
1925 H. Edwards
1934 L. W. Stenson Stenson
1950 H. P. Osborne
1951 W. G. Hayward
1958 R. J. M. May
1963 G. E. J. Whitmore
1965 William J. Hall
1974 M. J. Oatey
[--?--] (priest in charge) Philip de Grey-Warter

References

External links

Church of England church buildings in Cornwall
Grade I listed churches in Cornwall